The 1972–73 Coupe de France was its 56th edition. It was won by Olympique Lyonnais which defeated FC Nantes in the Final.

Round of 16

Quarter-finals

Semi-finals
First round

Second round

Final

References

French federation

1972–73 domestic association football cups
1972–73 in French football
1972-73